R & J Templeton Ltd was founded in 1880 by Robert Templeton. R & J Templeton Ltd styled themselves as "Tea Merchants and Cash Grocers". By 1910 the company had built a network of 50 shops (40 of which were in Glasgow), usually they rented corner sites in poor districts. Their key grocery products were "dry goods" - tea, cereals, flour, jams and confectionery.

Acquisition 
The company was acquired by Jurgens in 1919 through Home and Colonial Stores Glasgow subsidiary Shepherd's Dairies for £132,045 eventually becoming part of the Allied Suppliers network.

References

Scottish brands
Defunct retail companies of the United Kingdom